Municipal election in Ostrava was held as part of Czech municipal elections in 2018.

Current composition of assembly

Background

Previous election
Previous election was held in 2014. ANO 2011 has won the election. ANO then negotiated with Ostravak, KDU-ČSL and ODS about possible coalition. Negotiations were unsuccessful and  Ostravak agreed to form coalition with ČSSD and KSČM. This coalition broke quickly afterwards giving ANO 2011 new opportunity. Coalition was finally formed between ANO, ČSSD and KDU-ČSL and leader of Ostravan ANO Tomáš Macura became new Mayor. Coalition ruled Ostrava until December 2015 when ĆSSD and KDU-ČSL left the coalition. ANO 2011 the formed new coalition with ODS and Ostravak.

Campaign
ANO 2011 decided to nominate incumbent Mayor Romáš Macura as its leader on 20 January 2018.

The Civic Democratic Party (ODS) announced on 12 February 2018 that Senator Zdeněk Nytra will lead party in the election. TOP 09 and Freeholder Party of the Czech Republic decided to support ODS in the election.

Czech Social Democratic Party (ČSSD) had to deal with inner problems during March 2018. 6 deputies left the party. It reduced ČSSD to only 7 seats in Assembly. Deputies who left the party, included Lumír Palyza who led the party in previous election.

Opinion polls

Result

References

2018
2018 elections in the Czech Republic